Super Grover's Box Car Derby is the name for three similar steel roller coasters at SeaWorld San Antonio and SeaWorld Orlando in the Sesame Street sections of each park, a kid-oriented section, with one newly-built model being located at Sesame Place San Diego. The trains were originally designed to resemble the mascot, Shamu.

The Orlando version closed on April 8, 2018, for the retheme of Shamu's Happy Harbor to a Sesame Street themed area. The San Antonio version closed on January 6, 2019 for a retheme. Both versions reopened later in 2019 as Super Grover's Box Car Derby. Another clone of the ride is located at Sesame Place San Diego and opened with the park in March 2022.

References

SeaWorld Orlando
Roller coasters in Florida
Roller coasters in Texas
Roller coasters in California
Roller coasters introduced in 2004
Roller coasters introduced in 2006
Roller coasters introduced in 2019
Roller coasters introduced in 2022
Roller coasters operated by SeaWorld Parks & Entertainment